The Saucepan Journey (Swedish: Kastrullresan) is a 1950 Swedish comedy family film directed by Arne Mattsson and starring Eva Dahlbeck, Sigge Fürst and Edvin Adolphson. The film's sets were designed by the art director Jan Boleslaw.

Cast
 Eva Dahlbeck as 	Mamma Larsson
 Sigge Fürst as 	Per Ivar Patrik (PIP) Larsson
 Edvin Adolphson as 	Enoksson
 Sture Lagerwall as 	Vilfred Vågberg
 Olof Winnerstrand as 	Farbror Enok
 Julia Cæsar a sFröken Lur
 Lasse Sarri as Lasse Larsson
 Björn Berglund as Motorcykelpolis
 Ann Bornholm as 	Miranda (Mirre) Larsson
 Svea Holst as 	Fröken Eternell
 Ragnvi Lindbladh as 	Tant Bella
 Pär Lundin as 	Lilla O
 John Melin as 	Herr Sirius
 Inger Norberg as 	Rosalinda Larsson
 Birgitta Olzon as 	Desdemona (Dessi) Larsson
 Öyvind Serrander as 	Knutte Larsson
 Tom Walter as 	Svartis
 Birger Åsander as 	Lång-John
 Hans Lindgren as 	Sven 
 Gunnar Lundin as 	Motorcykelpolis

References

Bibliography 
 Qvist, Per Olov & von Bagh, Peter. Guide to the Cinema of Sweden and Finland. Greenwood Publishing Group, 2000.

External links 
 

1950 films
Swedish comedy films
1950 comedy films
1950s Swedish-language films
Films directed by Arne Mattsson
Films based on Swedish novels
1950s Swedish films